This is a list of all full international footballers to play for Reading. Players who were capped while a Reading player are marked in bold.

International representatives

Current Reading players

Former Reading players

References

National Football Teams

Internationals
Reading Internationals
International
Association football player non-biographical articles
Reading